Andrews Air Force Base is a census-designated place (CDP) covering the residential population of Andrews Air Force Base/Joint Base Andrews, in Prince George's County, Maryland, Maryland, United States. The population at the 2020 Census was 3,025.

Demographics

2020 census

Note: the US Census treats Hispanic/Latino as an ethnic category. This table excludes Latinos from the racial categories and assigns them to a separate category. Hispanics/Latinos can be of any race.

2000 Census
As of the census of 2000, there were 7,925 people, 1,932 households, and 1,864 families residing in the CDP. There were 2,133 housing units at an average density of 311.9 sq mi (120.4/km). The racial makeup of the base was 65.3% White, 22.8% African American, 0.6% Native American, 3.2% Asian, 0.1% Pacific Islander, 3.7% from other races, and 4.4% from two or more races. Hispanic or Latino people of any race were 8.7% of the population.

There were 1,932 households, out of which 75.9% had children under the age of 18 living with them, 86.1% were married couples living together, 7.3% had a female householder with no husband present, and 3.5% were non-families. 3.2% of all households were made up of individuals, none of whom was 65 years of age or older. The average household size was 3.39 and the average family size was 3.44.

In the CDP, the population was spread out, with 35.0% under the age of 18, 16.3% from 18 to 24, 44.9% from 25 to 44, 3.6% from 45 to 64, and 0.2% who were 65 years of age or older. The median age was 24 years. For every 100 females, there were 119.7 males. For every 100 females age 18 and over, there were 126.0 males.

The median income for a household in the base was $44,310, and the median income for a family was $42,866. Males had a median income of $27,070 versus $27,308 for females. The per capita income for the base was $16,520. About 2.6% of families and 2.4% of the population were below the poverty line, including of the total population, 2.8% of those under the age of 18 and none of those 65 and older.

References

Census-designated places in Prince George's County, Maryland